Sterling Watson, M.A., University of Florida, Emeritus Professor of Literature and Creative Writing,  co-director of Writers in Paradise and former director of the Writing Workshop at Eckerd College in St. Petersburg, Florida, is a fiction writer and screenwriter.

His first three novels are Weep No More My Brother, The Calling, and Blind Tongues. Deadly Sweet is the first in his Eddie Priest series of novels. He is a co-author with Dennis Lehane (Eckerd College 1988) of the screenplay Bad Blood. His main professional interests are fiction, playwriting, screenwriting, American, British and European short and long fiction, and the theater. He was for five years the fiction editor of The Florida Quarterly and taught secondary English and later fiction writing at Raiford Prison. He has won four Florida Arts Council Grants for fiction writing.

In January 2007, Watson participated in Eckerd College's third annual Writers in Paradise writing program which he co-created and co-directs with Lehane.

In January 2023, he released the book Night Letter.

External links
Watson's Eckerd College biography

References 

Living people
University of Florida alumni
Eckerd College alumni
Eckerd College faculty
American male writers
Year of birth missing (living people)